The green puddle frog,  rough-skinned floating frog, pearly skin puddle frog, or pointed-tongued floating frog (Occidozyga lima) is a species of frog in the family Dicroglossidae.
It is found in Bangladesh, Cambodia, China, Hong Kong, India, Indonesia, Laos, Malaysia, Myanmar, Thailand, Vietnam, and possibly Nepal.

Its natural habitats are subtropical or tropical seasonally wet or flooded lowland grassland, rivers, swamps, intermittent freshwater lakes, freshwater marshes, intermittent freshwater marshes, ponds, irrigated land, seasonally flooded agricultural land, and canals and ditches. These frogs are also found in the pet trade.

O. lima may actually consist of separate species, with Chan (2013) arguing for 3 separate species: (1) Java, Indonesia; (2) southern China to northern Indochina; (3) southern Indochina to Myanmar.

References

External links
Amphibian and Reptiles of Peninsular Malaysia - Occidozyga lima

Occidozyga
Amphibians of Bangladesh
Amphibians of Myanmar
Amphibians of Cambodia
Frogs of China
Fauna of Hong Kong
Frogs of India
Amphibians of Indonesia
Amphibians of Laos
Amphibians of Malaysia
Amphibians of Thailand
Amphibians of Vietnam
Amphibians described in 1829
Taxa named by Johann Ludwig Christian Gravenhorst
Taxonomy articles created by Polbot